County Road 5096 is a  long county road in Eidfjord Municipality in Vestland county, Norway. The road heads northeast from the village of Eidfjord.  Prior to 2020, the road was called County Road 103.  It was changed in 2020 when Vestland county was created.

The road branches off from Norwegian National Road 7 at Eidfjord and runs along the south shore of the Simadal Fjord. After passing the Sima Hydroelectric Power Station at the mouth of the Sima River below Kjeåsen, the road continues into the Sima Valley, where it terminates.

References

External links
Statens vegvesen – trafikkmeldinger Fv103 (Traffic Information: County Road 103)

5096
Eidfjord